"Fools Love" is the 2004 debut single from New Zealand hip hop duo Misfits of Science. The song spent four weeks at No.1 on the New Zealand singles chart in August 2004. The music video was nominated for Best Music Video at the 2004 New Zealand Music Awards.

The song samples Doris Day's recording of "Perhaps, Perhaps, Perhaps" and "A Fool in Love" by Ike & Tina Turner.

Music video 

The music video was directed by Shane Mason and Mark Trethewey. It is made in an animated style, giving the rap duo comedically oversized heads and surrounding them with hip hop cliches, such as car, cash, and booty girls. The video was nominated for Best Music video at the 2004 New Zealand Music Awards, and also won best video at the 2004 bNet Music Awards and the 2004 Juice TV Awards. The video also prompted the creation of a Special Commendation award for directors Trethewey and Mason at the 2004 Kodak Music Clip Awards.

Track listing 

CD
"Fools Love" – 4:00
"Fools Love Ragga Remix" (Radio Edit) featuring Tuff Enchant
"Fools Love" (Instrumental)
"Fools Love" (A Capella)

Charts and certifications

Production credits 

 Engineer: Shane Mason, Simon Holloway
 Engineer (Assistant): Ben Hudson, Sonna Fegert
 Executive Producer: Adee Keil, Simon Holloway
 Producer: Misfits of Science (MOS)
 Producer (Additional), mixed by, mastered by: Simon Holloway

References

External links 
 "Fools Love" music video at NZ On Screen

2004 singles
Number-one singles in New Zealand
Misfits of Science (group) songs
2004 songs